The Koni class is the NATO reporting name for an anti-submarine warfare frigate built by the Soviet Union. They were known in the Soviet Union as Project 1159. 14 were built in Zelenodolsk shipyard between 1975 and 1988. They were originally intended to replace the older s, but were instead chosen as a design for export to various friendly navies. The Koni I sub class were designed for European waters and the Koni II were made for warmer waters. One ship was retained by the Soviets in the Black Sea for training foreign crews. Only a few of these vessels remain in service today.

The Romanian Tetal-class corvettes were similar.

Design

Armament

The armament consisted of two AK-726 twin  gun mountings and two AK-230 twin  anti-aircraft guns, 4 P-15M Termit anti-ship missile launchers were fitted in some ships, depth charge and naval mine racks were fitted at the stern. The Libyan vessels had a redesigned layout with the P-15M missiles forward of the bridge. The ships had contemporary Soviet radar and sonar.

Propulsion

The ships had 3-shaft CODAG machinery suite, identical to that used in the s (Project 1124).

Ships in class

MV Captain Keith Tibbetts
In September 1996 a former Cuban Navy Koni II-class frigate designated 356 was scuttled in shallow water in Cayman Brac. This ship was built in 1984 as one of three Koni II-class frigates sold to Cuba to support its Cold War fleet. In 1996 the ship was purchased from Cuba by the Cayman Islands government to be scuttled in Cayman Brac as a dive attraction. The remaining two Cuban Koni II class were expended as targets. A serious storm in 2004 broke the ship in two, and her bow now lists at a 45 degree angle, while her midships have become a debris field. Before being sunk the ship was renamed Captain Keith Tibbetts after a local politician and diver. It is one of only a few sunken Soviet Naval vessels in the Western Hemisphere, and the only one of two that is easily dived including her sister ship SKR-451.

Patrol Boat 383, P.B.
On July 16, 1998 the former Cuban Navy Koni II-class frigate designated 353 was scuttled in shallow water near the Cuban resort town of Varadero in the Parque Submarino Cayo Piedra del Norte as an attraction for divers. It is rumored that Fidel Castro promoted the project, being an avid diver himself. For an unknown reason her hull number was changed from 353 to 383 prior to the scuttling. The dive operators in the Varadero area refer to the dive site as Patrol Boat 383 or simply P.B even though it is a frigate.

Original operators

 Soviet Union - 1 (to Bulgaria in 1990), Delfin was originally used for training foreign crews in the Black Sea, before being sold to the Bulgarian Navy, currently in service as Smeli (Bulgarian: Смели" ("Brave")).
 Algeria - 3, in service, being upgraded with new electronics, ASW torpedo tubes and 8 x Kh-35 Uran/SS-N-25 Switchblade anti-ship missiles
 Cuba - 3, 356 (No name) ex SKR-471 sunk as a reef, 353 (later 383) (Monkada or Moncada) ex SKR-451 sunk as a reef and 350 (Mariel) ex SKR-28 status unknown.
 East Germany / Germany - 3, two (Rostock and Halle) taken over by unified German Navy and paid off August 1991, one (Berlin - Hauptstadt der DDR) immediately put up for disposal in 1991.
 Libya - 1 (formerly 2), 4 x 406mm torpedo tubes, status unknown, damaged by bombing May 19/20 and on August 9, 2011. (Al Ghardabia). The remaining ship, Al Hani captured by National Transitional Council in Benghazi, and has become the flagship of the reorganized Libyan Navy.
 Yugoslavia - acquired two ships, Split (VPBR-31) and Koper (VPBR-32), during the 1980s.

See also
 List of ships of the Soviet Navy
 List of ships of Russia by project number

References

 
 Marinekameradschaft KSS
 PALUBAinfo Forum
  All Koni Class Frigates - Complete Ship List
 Militaryfactory.com Koni Class frigate

 
Frigate classes
Ships of the Soviet Navy
Frigates of the Soviet Union